Presidential elections were held in Georgia on 26 May 1991. The result was a victory for Zviad Gamsakhurdia of the Round Table-Free Georgia party, who won 87.6% of the vote, with an 82.9% turnout.

Results

References

Presidential elections in Georgia (country)
1991 in Georgia (country)
Georgia
Georgia